Daniel Freedman may refer to:

 Daniel X. Freedman (1921–1993), psychiatrist and educator
 Daniel G. Freedman (1927–2008), psychologist
 Daniel Z. Freedman (born 1939), American theoretical physicist

See also
 Daniel Freeman (disambiguation)
 Daniel Friedman (disambiguation)